Several French ships have borne the name Beaumont:

French ship Beaumont (1762), a 56-gun East Indiaman
French ship Beaumont (Acadian transport), a ship used to transport Acadians to Louisiana in 1785

French Navy ship names